Tom Sayles was an English professional footballer who played over 100 Football League games for Barnsley and Southend United.

References

Kiveton Park F.C. players
Sheffield F.C. players
Cardiff City F.C. players
Barnsley F.C. players
Southend United F.C. players
1892 births
1940 deaths
English footballers
Footballers from South Yorkshire
Association football fullbacks
English Football League players